The Ratardinae are a small subfamily of large moths from Southeast Asia.

Taxonomy and systematics
Ratardinae is a small subfamily of moths formerly placed in its own family Ratardidae and related to (and often included within) the Cossidae. Three genera are known, one quite recently described. One species, "Shisa" excellens, was originally placed in the Lymantriidae. The moths are large with rounded wings and strongly spotted wing patterns, and "pectinate" antennae. The relationships of this group to other Cossoidea needs reassessment, once suitable samples are available, with molecular data.

Distribution
About 13 relictually distributed species are restricted to Southeast Asia, occurring in Borneo, Sumatra, Peninsular Malaysia, northeastern Himalayas, and Taiwan.

Behaviour
The adults are very rarely found, feeble-flying, and occasionally are attracted to light, but more likely to be found flying by day.

Conservation
These large moths are so incredibly rarely found and their habitats under such massive threat from large-scale conversion of rainforest in Southeast Asia that their conservation status should be seriously considered and dedicated surveys conducted to assess their distribution and biology. One species (Ratarda melanoxantha) is probably protected by virtue of its occurrence in Mount Kinabalu National Park on Borneo, where it was found once.

References

Edwards, E.D., Gentili, P., Horak, M., Kristensen, N.P. and Nielsen, E.S. (1999). The cossoid/sesioid assemblage. Ch. 11, pp. 181–195 in Kristensen, N.P. (Ed.). Lepidoptera, Moths and Butterflies. Volume 1: Evolution, Systematics, and Biogeography. Handbuch der Zoologie. Eine Naturgeschichte der Stämme des Tierreiches / Handbook of Zoology. A Natural History of the phyla of the Animal Kingdom. Band / Volume IV Arthropoda: Insecta Teilband / Part 35: 491 pp. Walter de Gruyter, Berlin, New York.
Heynderycx, J. 2003. Les Ratardinae. Lambillionea, 103(1): 133-134.
Heppner J.B. and Wang, H.Y. 1987. A rare moth, Ratarda tertia Strand (Lepidoptera: Ratardidae), from Palin Taiwan. Táiwa-n she(nglì bówùgua(n bànniánka-n  (Táiwa-n she(nglì bówùgua(n bànniánka-n), 40: 91-94.
Holloway, J.D. (1986). The Moths of Borneo: Key to Families: Families Cossiae, Metarbelidae, Ratardidae, Dudgeonidae, Epipyropidae and Limacodidae. Malayan Nauture Journal, 40: 1-166.
Holloway, J.D. (1998). The Moths of Borneo: Families Castniidae, Callidulidae, Drepanidae and Uraniidae. Malayan Nauture Journal, 52: 1-155.
Kobes, L.W.R. and Ronkay, L. (1990). The Ratardidae of Sumatra, Heterocera Sumatrana, 6: 79-100.
Owada, M. (1993). The systematic position of Shisa excellens (Lepidoptera and Ratardidae). Japanese Journal of Entomology, 61(2): 251-260.

External links
The Moths of Borneo
NHM Lepindex
"Ratardinae Hampson, 1898" at Markku Savela's Lepidoptera and Some Other Life Forms. Retrieved May 16, 2017.

 
Cossidae
Moth subfamilies